is a railway station on the JR Hokkaido Hakodate Main Line. It is located in Nanae, Hokkaidō, Japan. It is operated by JR Hokkaido and has the station number "H71".

Lines
Both local and the Rapid Hakodate Liner services stop at the station.

Station layout
The station consists of a side and an island platform serving three tracks.

Platforms

Adjacent stations

History
After the Hokkaido Railway was nationalized on 1 July 1907, Japanese Government Railways (JGR) took over control of the station. On 12 October 1909 the station became part of the Hakodate Main Line. On 1 April 1987, with the privatization of Japanese National Railways (JNR), the successor of JGR, control of the station passed to JR Hokkaido.

See also
 List of railway stations in Japan

References

Nanae Station
Railway stations in Japan opened in 1902